The UK Parliament petitions website (e-petitions) allows members of the public to create and support petitions for consideration by the Parliament of the United Kingdom. Although the UK Parliament's Petitions Committee considers all petitions which receive 100,000 signatures or more, there is no automatic parliamentary debate of those that pass this threshold. The Government will respond to all petitions with more than 10,000 signatures.

Process
Once a petition has been published on the website, it will be open to signatures for six months.

At 10,000 signatures, the government will formally respond.
 At 100,000 signatures, the request will be considered by the Petitions Committee for debate in Parliament.

On 1 November 2019, it was announced that all petitions were closed, including those that had been open for less than six months, because of the General Election. Petitions will not be re-opened after the election. When there is a general election, Parliament closes for a few weeks before the vote, for the election campaign. The petitions website is part of the official work of Parliament, so it has to stop too.

Hosting and history of the website
The rights of petitioners and the power of the House of Commons to deal with petitions were expressed in resolutions of the Commons in 1669. The number of petitions being presented each year fell considerably in the twentieth century. In the early 2000s, both the Government and the House of Commons began to explore ways for the public to start and sign petitions electronically.

The original e-petitions process was created by Labour Prime Minister Tony Blair in November 2006 and hosted on the Downing Street website. Petitions were directed to government departments rather than MPs. Within the first six months, 2,860 active petitions were created and one received over one million signatures. The process was suspended prior to the 2010 general election.

The e-petitions were relaunched by the Conservative–Liberal Democrat Coalition government in July 2011. Petitions backed by 100,000 signatures would now be considered for debate in Parliament and the website was moved to Directgov. In the following year, a total of 36,000 petitions were submitted, attracting 6.4 million signatures. After the closure of the Directgov website, the e-petitions were moved to the new GOV.UK website in October 2012. Just over 30 petitions were debated in Parliament over four years. By 2012, research by the Hansard Society and discussions in Parliament proposed: giving more time for petitions to be debated by MPs outside the main Commons chamber, the petitions site being taken over by Parliament, and a Petitions Committee being established to look at how e-petitions work and which ones should get parliamentary attention.

The House of Commons Procedure Committee produced a proposal in 2014 for e-petitions to be run jointly between the House of Commons and the Government and for the establishment of a new Petitions Committee to consider petitions for a debate in the House of Commons and scrutinise the Government's response. The Petitions Committee was formed in 2015 during David Cameron's Conservative government and e-petitions were relaunched in July 2015 on the Parliament website.

Since 2015, the website is hosted by Unboxed, a digital consultancy from UK, which was often quoted in the national news surrounding the very popular petition of March 2019 which crashed the website database and forced the provider to scale up its hosting and tweak its code.

Notable petitions

As of March 2019 the petition with the most signatures, with 6.1 million signatories, is a petition requesting the revocation of Article 50 and for the United Kingdom to remain in the European Union. Started on 12 February 2019,  it acquired more than 4 million signatures in 48 hours, between 21 March and 23 March 2019, following Prime Minister Theresa May's speech to the nation after the UK had requested that the Article 50 period be extended and a public campaign by political groups. Internet traffic to the UK Parliament Petitions website was so high that the website crashed multiple times during the initial 24 hours of the petition's public campaign.

The second most signed petition, with 4.2 million signatories, requested that Parliament hold another referendum on the UK's membership of the European Union if the result of the June 2016 "Brexit" referendum was "less than 60% based on a turnout less than 75%" (which threshold was not reached), but Parliament did not comply with the petitioners' request. This petition had been started in May 2016 before the Brexit referendum, by a supporter of Brexit, who stated that he was unhappy that the petition was signed by supporters of Remain following the referendum result.

A 2007 petition to oppose plans to introduce road pricing gathered 1.8 million signatures on an earlier version of the petitions website hosted on the Downing Street website. Prime Minister Tony Blair emailed all those who signed to inform them that trials would still go ahead.

In 2015, a petition called for legalisation of cannabis in the United Kingdom attracted more than 200,000 signatures and was debated in parliament.

A petition in December 2015 sought to ban Donald Trump from entering the UK; this gained more than 550,000 signatories and caused the website to crash. A subsequent petition launched in January 2017 called for Donald Trump to be banned from an official state visit to the UK following his election as U.S. president, and received over 1.8 million signatures. Neither petition was successful.

In March 2016, a petition calling for provision of meningitis B vaccine to all children in the UK received over 800,000 signatures, and the issue was subsequently debated in Parliament.

In October 2020, footballer Marcus Rashford began a petition that gathered 1 million signatures. The petition called for the end of child food poverty with three demands: expand access to Free School Meals, provide meals & activities during holidays to stop holiday hunger & increase the value of and expand the Healthy Start scheme.

Petitions with more than 500,000 signatures

References

2015 establishments in the United Kingdom
Government services web portals in the United Kingdom
Open government in the United Kingdom
Internet properties established in 2015
British political websites
Online petitions